Golden Krust Caribbean Bakery, Inc. is a Caribbean fast casual restaurant operator and manufacturer of Caribbean cuisine including Jamaican food, Jamaican patty, and other baked goods.

The parent company is owned by the Hawthorne family, and the stores are franchised. There are over 100 Golden Krust restaurants operating in ten U.S. states: New York, New Jersey, Connecticut, Pennsylvania, Georgia, Florida, Maryland, North Carolina, Massachusetts, and Texas. The majority of the restaurants are situated in New York. It is New York City's largest locally-owned restaurant chain.

The company also distributes food products to retailers, schools and prisons, is considered the foremost Jamaican business in the U.S. and was featured on the CBS reality television show Undercover Boss in 2016. It is also "the only company that makes and distributes nine varieties of Jamaican-style patties."

History
Golden Krust's origins trace back to a 50-year-old bakery owned by Ephraim Hawthorne in Saint Andrew, Jamaica, that claims to serve family recipes. Ephraim's son Lowell Hawthorne, Golden Krust's former President and CEO, opened the first U.S. restaurant in 1989 on Gun Hill Road in the Bronx. To open its first restaurant, the Hawthorne family, according to Business Opportunities Journal pooled $107,000, "using the Caribbean concept of susu, whereby everyone pitched in $100 a week to raise start-up money after banks refused them a loan."

Jamaica's ambassador to the United States was present for the opening of the chain's fifth store in Atlanta, Georgia in 2009.

The parent company later became involved in the financial services industry. Hawthorne came to New York in 1981 and graduated from Bronx Community College before working as an accountant with the New York Police Department for nine years. As of 2005, Nine brothers and sisters are involved in the family business; In 2016 there were a total 11 Hawthornes: Milton, Omar, Daren, Haywood, Lorraine, Lowell, Marcia, Herma, Velma, Lorna, and Monique.

Lowell Hawthorne was found dead of suicide on December 2, 2017, aged 57, inside a Golden Krust factory in the Bronx. He was in debt, faced tax liens in excess of $150,000, and a class-action lawsuit. Still, his death was mourned by many including former employees, colleagues and Jamaican Prime Minister Andrew Holness. Hawthorne was previously featured on the CBS reality television show Undercover Boss in 2016.

Menu

Their restaurants serve mildly spicy, and hot, Jamaican patties, jerk chicken and fish, dumplings, steamed yams, and curried meat dishes. Items served include callaloo (Caribbean greens) and ackee.

In 1998 the company produced 25 million flaky burnt-orange patties on assembly lines at its main facility. The restaurants do a lot of take-out business, as the patties are portable, and also distributes to supermarkets in 30 states. Offerings include beef patty, vegetable patty, spicy beef and cheese patty, soy patty, oxtail, curried goat, brown stew chicken, roti filled with curried meat or vegetables, and "coco" bread.

West Indian community
The eateries are a drawn to the West Indian community. Many of its original franchises were opened by nurses, and many are opened near hospitals where many workers are West Indian with Caribbean heritage. Core customers come from Jamaica, Guyana, Trinidad and Tobago, Barbados, Haiti, The Bahamas, St. Lucia, and Grenada.

The chain started out serving Caribbean immigrants, but customers now includes Americans and immigrants of all national ancestries. The type of food served is "becoming more and more familiar to all Americans thanks to holidays taken in Aruba, Jamaica, or Trinidad and Tobago, or through meeting at work people from these islands and others." By 2009, there were plans to open an additional 250 stores over the next five years in the U.S., Europe, Canada, and the Caribbean.

Operations
The restaurants do mostly take-out and have limited seating. The decor is decorated in bright "sunny" yellow and orange tiles. Competing patty producers include Tower Isles Frozen Foods in Bedford-Stuyvesant, which sells more than 100,000 patties a day to supermarkets, convenience stores, delis and pizza shops that bake them on site, and Caribbean Food Delights, which makes 250,000 a day at a factory in Tappan, N.Y. "for sale at major supermarkets and warehouse chains, including Costco, Wal-Mart and Pathmark." In August 2016, the company announced plans to move and consolidate all its operations to Orangeburg, New York, near the Caribbean Food Delights location.

The Hawthornes hope to add the Jamaican patty to the list of American ethnic fast foods alongside the Italian pizza slice, Jewish bagel, and the Chinese noodle. The company uses a rising sun logo and has a city contract to serve lunches to prison inmates and schoolchildren.

In popular culture
The chain was featured on the U.S. version of Undercover Boss in episode 12 of season 7 in 2016.

References

External links

Image of a Golden Krust meal
 The free company report: http://new-york.intercreditreport.com/company/golden-krust-caribbean-bakery-grill-inc-4320848

Caribbean-American cuisine
Caribbean-American culture in New York (state)
Restaurants established in 1989
Caribbean-American history
Fast-food chains of the United States
Jamaican-American history
Jamaican cuisine
Restaurants in New York City
1989 establishments in New York City
Companies based in the Bronx